Liverpool Land is a peninsula in eastern Greenland.

Geography 
The peninsula is bounded by Scoresby Sund in the south, Carlsberg Fjord in the northwest, Kangerterajiva (Hurry Inlet) in the southwest, the Greenland Sea in the east, and Jameson Land in the west. It was named by William Scoresby, who thought that Hurry Inlet had a confluence with Carlsberg Fjord, separating Liverpool Land from Jameson Land.

A large part of Liverpool Land is mountainous, the Didrik Pining Range and the Heywood Range are located in the peninsula. 

The southern coast of Liverpool Land is the location of the town of Ittoqqortoormiit and of the abandoned settlements of Itterajivit, and Uunarteq at the southernmost tip of Liverpool Land.

Transport 

Access to the region is gained through the Nerlerit Inaat Airport, with scheduled services to Reykjavík in Iceland and Kulusuk in southeastern Greenland, operated by Icelandair.

See also
 Milne Land
 Renland
 Scoresby Land

References

Peninsulas of Greenland